This is a list of Georgia companies, current and former businesses whose headquarters are, or were, in the U.S. state of Georgia.

Companies based in Georgia

A
 Aaron's, Inc.
 Acuity Brands
 Aflac
 AGCO
 Axiall
 American Honda Power Equipment Division and Honda Marine Group
 American Megatrends
 AT&T Mobility
 Atlanta Bread Company
 Autotrader.com

B
 Beazer Homes USA
 Blue Bird Corporation
 BlueLinx

C
 Carter's
 Chick-fil-A
 CNN
 The Coca-Cola Company
 Colonial Pipeline
 Cox Communications
 Cox Enterprises
 Cox Radio
 Crawford & Company

D
 Delta Air Lines

E
 EarthLink
 Equifax
 Exide
 EyeMail Inc.

F
 Floor & Decor
 Flowers Foods

G
 Genuine Parts Company
 Georgia-Pacific
 Global Franchise Group
 Great American Cookies
 Greenwood (bank)

H
 Hitachi Koki U.S.A. Ltd. and Hitachi Telecom Inc.
 The Home Depot
 Hooters
 Huddle House
 Havertys

L
 LexisNexis Risk Solutions
 LendingPoint

M
 Manheim Auctions
 Marble Slab Creamery
 Moe's Southwest Grill

N
 NanoLumens
 The National Bank of Georgia
 NCR Corporation
 Newell Brands

O
 Oxford Industries

P
 Pretzelmaker

R
 Rollins, Inc.
 RaceTrac Petroleum, Inc.

S
 Sharecare
 Southern Company
 Southern Company Gas
 Spanx
 Sterling Ledet & Associates
 Synovus

T
 Ted's Montana Grill
 The Weather Channel
 Tropical Smoothie Cafe
 Truist Bank (SunTrust / BB&T merger)
 TSYS
 Turner Broadcasting System

U
 United Parcel Service

V
Vendormate

W
 W. C. Bradley Co.
 Waffle House
 WestRock
 World Financial Group

Z
 Zaxby's

Companies formerly based in Georgia

A
 Atlantic Southeast Airlines

B
 Bill Heard Enterprises
 Blimpie

C
 CareerBuilder
 Carmike Cinemas
 Ciba Vision

D
 Detonics
 Don Pablo's

E
 Element Skateboards

G
 Gold Kist

H
 Harveys Supermarkets

I
 Infor

K
 Kaiser Permanente

M
 Mirant

N
 Newell Brands

R
 RockTenn

S
 Spectrum Brands

W
 World Airways

References

Georgia